Matthias Glasner (born 20 January 1965) is a German film director. He directed more than twenty films since 1987.

Selected filmography
The Meds (1995)
Sexy Sadie (1996)
Fandango (2000)
High Score (2001, TV film)
Tatort: Flashback (2002, TV series episode)
Die fremde Frau (2003, TV film)
The Free Will (2006)
This Is Love (2009)
 (2011, TV film)
Tatort: Die Ballade von Cenk und Valerie (2012, TV series episode)
Mercy (2012)
 (2015, TV miniseries)
Landgericht (2017, TV film)
Polizeiruf 110: Demokratie stirbt in Finsternis (2018, TV series episode)
Das Boot (2020, TV series, 4 episodes)

References

External links 

1965 births
Living people
Mass media people from Hamburg